Bess Larkin Housser Harris (1890–1969) was a Canadian painter who participated in Group of Seven exhibitions and was a member of the Canadian Group of Painters.

Biography
Bess Larkin was born in 1890 in Manitoba. She attended Havergal College in Toronto, Ontario. Bess married F. B. Housser in 1914. The two eventually divorced when Bess discovered Housser's affair with the artist Yvonne McKague, and in 1934 Bess married Lawren Harris. After her marriage to Lawren Harris the two spent time in the United States. In 1940 they moved to Vancouver, British Columbia.

Harris did not have a formal art education, but she did take painting lessons from Frederick Varley. Throughout the 1920s she participated, when invited, to Group of Seven shows. In 1926, Harris participated in the Wembley show in England, and in 1930 her work was shown at the Corcoran Gallery of Art in Washington, DC. She was a member of the Canadian Group of Painters.

Harris contributed articles about art to the Canadian Bookman between 1923 and 1926.

Harris died in 1969 in Vancouver.

References

External links
 Bess Larkin Housser Harris images on Invaluable
 Bess Larkin Housser Harris images on AskArt

1890 births
1969 deaths
20th-century Canadian women artists
20th-century Canadian artists
Canadian women painters